On April 18, 2012, the Los Angeles Times released photos of U.S. soldiers posing with body parts of dead insurgents, after a soldier in the 82nd Airborne Division gave the photos to the L.A. Times to draw attention to "a breakdown in security, discipline and professionalism" among U.S. troops operating in Afghanistan. The pictures had been taken at a police station in Zabol province in February 2010.

The event followed two other recent and embarrassing revelations about soldier morale and discipline in the US army: the case of soldiers urinating on dead Taliban soldiers in 2011, which was made public in January 2012, and the burning of the Quran by at Bagram Airfield, which had occurred in February.

Reactions

U.S. Secretary of Defense Leon E. Panetta immediately called the soldiers' behavior unacceptable, promised a full investigation, and said about the soldiers behavior in comparison to the U.S. armed forces in general, "This is not who we are, and it's certainly not what we represent when it comes to the great majority of men and women in uniform." 

The actions of the soldiers were also condemned by General John Allen, commander of the International Security Assistance Force in Afghanistan (ISAF). US Ambassador to Afghanistan Ryan Crocker said, "The actions were morally repugnant, dishonor the sacrifices of hundreds of thousands of U.S. soldiers and civilians who have served with distinction in Afghanistan, and do not represent the core values of the United States or our military." The New York Times reported that President Obama called for an investigation of the matter and said that those responsible would be held accountable. 

In Afghanistan, Taliban spokesman Zabiullah Mujahid called the pictures disrespectful and condemned both the U.S. soldiers involved in the pictures as well as the Afghan police also featured in them. "We strongly condemn these occupiers and their puppets who are without culture, who are brutal and inhuman," Mujahid said. "Next to these occupiers there are some Afghans -- puppets -- who were ordered to stand next to the bodies of the martyrs." Afghan President Hamid Karzai called it "a disgusting act to take photos with body parts and then share it with others".

A day after the photos were released, there had been no news of mass protests by the Afghan people like the earlier Quran burnings in February, which Afghan lawmakers ascribed to the Afghan people's lack of sympathy for suicide bombers. Mohammad Naim Lalai Hamidzai, a parliamentarian from southern Kandahar, told the Associated Press that "the people of Afghanistan remember the killing of innocent people by suicide bombers and people do not have a good image of these suicide bombers. The burning of Qurans and the killing of children create emotions in people, but there is no sympathy for suicide bombers who kill innocent people." Another reason for the muted reaction in Afghanistan was that evening TV bulletins did not show the photos and that many ordinary Afghans had no internet access.

Investigation and action

On the day of the release, the Army announced that it had started a criminal investigation. By 2018, there were no reports freely available on the World Wide Web about the results of the investigation. On May 4, 2012, however, weeks after the pictures' release, U.S. Secretary of Defense Leon E. Panetta visited Ft. Benning, Georgia and spoke to the 3rd Infantry Brigade about the need for discipline. He said, "These days it takes only seconds for a picture, a photo, to suddenly become an international headline. And those headlines can impact the mission we're engaged in. They can put your fellow service members at risk. They can hurt morale. They can damage our standing in the world, and they can cost lives." The case appears to have ended, at least publicly, with that speech.

See also
 Abu Ghraib torture and prisoner abuse

References

2012 in Afghanistan
War in Afghanistan (2001–2021)
United States military scandals
2012 in the United States
2012 in international relations